Azerbaijani carpet weaving is a historical and traditional activity of the Azerbaijani people. The Azerbaijani carpet is a traditional handmade textile of various sizes, with dense texture and a pile or pile-less surface, whose patterns are characteristic of Azerbaijan’s many carpet-making regions. Carpet making is a family tradition transferred orally and through practice.

In 2010, the art of Azerbaijani carpet weaving in Azerbaijan was added to the UNESCO List of the Intangible Cultural Heritage of Humanity.

Carpet weaving and community 

In the years following Azerbaijan's independence from the Soviet Union, Azerbaijani carpet weaving tradition has been the subject to the special attention of the Azerbaijani government's efforts to preserve, study, promote and develop carpet weaving traditions. The Law “On the protection and development of carpet art of Azerbaijan” was adopted by the President Ilham Aliyev in December 2004, "Azerkhalcha" OJSC was established in May 2016, Carpet Weaver Day started to be celebrated on May 5th according to the Presidential Decree dated 25.11.2016, the new building for Azerbaijan Carpet Museum designed by an Austrian architect Franz Janz in the shape of a rolled carpet was put into use in August 2014. In addition, State Program on the “Protection and development of carpet art in the Republic of Azerbaijan 2018-2022” was approved in February 2018 by President Ilham Aliyev with the aim to create raw material supply for this industry, improve the infrastructure for carpet-weaving, support the establishment of new workplaces and carry out qualified personnel training in the field of carpet-weaving. Furthermore, wool processing, wool and silk yarns manufacturing, and processing plants used for coloring and production of dyes were also given attention.

References

External links 
 The traditional art of Azerbaijani carpet weaving in the Republic of Azerbaijan
 The Azerbaijani carpet. Video

Azerbaijani culture
Masterpieces of the Oral and Intangible Heritage of Humanity
Azerbaijani rugs and carpets